Adam Malcher (born 21 May 1986) is a Polish handball player for Gwardia Opole and the Polish national handball team.

He participated at the 2009 World Men's Handball Championship and at the  2017 World Men's Handball Championship.

Sporting achievements

Clubs
 National championships
 2006/2007  Polish Championship, with Zagłębie Lubin

National team
 2009  IHF World Championship

References

1986 births
Living people
People from Opole
Sportspeople from Opole Voivodeship
Polish male handball players